Nisŏ station is a railway station in Mundŏk County, South P'yŏngan Province, North Korea. It is on located on the P'yŏngŭi Line of the Korean State Railway.

References

Railway stations in North Korea